The 1986 FIG Rhythmic Gymnastics World Cup was the second Rhythmic Gymnastics World Cup, held from October 17 to 19 in Tokyo, Japan. The competition was officially organized by the International Gymnastics Federation.

Medalists

Medal table

See also
 World Rhythmic Gymnastics Championships
 FIG World Cup
 List of medalists at the FIG World Cup Final

References

Rhythmic Gymnastics World Cup
International gymnastics competitions hosted by Japan
1986 in gymnastics